The Joondalup Giants Rugby League Club is an Australian rugby league football club based in Joondalup, Western Australia that competes in The Western Australian Rugby League. Founded in 1990, The Joondalup Giants provide the northern suburbs of Perth with a family friendly Rugby League club that has one of the strongest junior bases in Western Australia. The club fields junior teams from u6s through to u16s and senior teams, u18s, Women's league tag, women's tackle, Val Murphy Trophy, Reserve grade and Premiership grade.

Notable Juniors
Notable Professional First Grade Players that have played at Joondalup Giants include:

Lee Te Maari (2006-10 St George, Canterbury & Parramatta)
Curtis Rona (2014-16 North Queensland Cowboys & Canterbury-Bankstown Bulldogs) 
Waqa Blake (2015- Penrith Panthers & Parramatta Eels)

See also

 Rugby league in Australia
Rugby league in Western Australia
Affiliated States Championship

References

External links
Joondalup Giants RLFC Fox Sports pulse

Rugby league in Australia

Rugby league teams in Western Australia
Sporting clubs in Perth, Western Australia
1990 establishments in Australia
Rugby clubs established in 1990